Top-down may refer to:

Arts and entertainment 
 "Top Down", a 2007 song by Swizz Beatz
 "Top Down", a song by Lil Yachty from Lil Boat 3
 "Top Down", a song by Fifth Harmony from Reflection

Science 
 Top-down reading, is a part of reading science that explains the reader's psycholinguistic strategies in using grammatical and lexical knowledge for comprehension rather than linearly decoding texts.
 Top-down proteomics, a method for protein analysis
 Top-down effects, effects of population density on a resource in a soil food web
Neural top–down control of physiology
Top-down processing, in Pattern recognition (psychology)

Computing 
 Top-down and bottom-up design of information ordering
 Top-down parsing, a parsing strategy beginning at the highest level of the parse tree
Top-down parsing language, an analytic formal grammar to study top-down parsers
 Top-down perspective, a camera angle in computer and video games
 Top-down shooter, a subgenre of video games

Investing 
 Top-down investment analysis, an investment selection technique that evaluates macro factors (e.g., economy and industry) before micro factors (e.g., specific company)

See also 
 Horizontal and vertical writing in East Asian scripts, including writing in columns going from top to bottom and ordered from right to left
 Bottom-up (disambiguation)